Natallia Shavel (born 3 December 1973) is a Belarusian Paralympic swimmer who competes in international level events. She competed at the 2020 Summer Paralympics.

Life 
Shavel was 23 when she was involved in a car accident which resulted in a spinal cord injury. She competed at the 2010 IPC Swimming World Championships Eindhoven, winning a silver medal in Women's 50 m Butterfly S5, and Women's 200 m Individual Medley SM5

References

Living people
Belarusian female backstroke swimmers
Belarusian female breaststroke swimmers
Belarusian female butterfly swimmers
Belarusian female medley swimmers
1973 births
Swimmers at the 2004 Summer Paralympics
Swimmers at the 2008 Summer Paralympics
Swimmers at the 2012 Summer Paralympics
Swimmers at the 2016 Summer Paralympics
Medalists at the World Para Swimming Championships
Medalists at the World Para Swimming European Championships
S5-classified Paralympic swimmers